Hendrik Heerschop (1626, Haarlem – 1690, Haarlem), was a Dutch Golden Age painter.

Biography
Son of the Haarlem tailor Harmen Jansz. and his second wife Jopje Jansdr. van Kuyndert (from Kuinre, Overijssel). The family was possibly Mennonist; Hendrick married Janneke Jansdr. van Kuyndert on November 20, 1650.

According to Houbraken he was a painter of conversation pieces.

According to the RKD he was a pupil of Willem Claesz Heda. And he was most likely also pupil of Rembrandt Harmenszoon van Rijn.

References

 Paintings by or after Hendrik Heerschop can be found at RKD.
 
Hendrik Heerschop on Artnet

1626 births
1690 deaths
Dutch Golden Age painters
Dutch male painters
Artists from Haarlem